The Disasters Emergency Committee (DEC) is an umbrella group of UK charities which coordinates and launches collective appeals to raise funds to provide emergency aid and rapid relief to people caught up in disasters and humanitarian crises around the world.  Since being formed in 1963, the DEC has had strong relationships with major UK broadcasters in particular the BBC and ITV, who provide airtime to broadcast emergency appeals upon its recommendation. It is a member of the global Emergency Appeals Alliance, which reports that since its first television appeal in 1966, the DEC has raised over £1.4 billion. 

The DEC is a registered charity (charity no: 1062638) with 15 charity members all with associated disaster relief capabilities such as providing clean water, humanitarian aid and medical care.

The charity came to increased prominence during the 2022 Russian invasion of Ukraine when people donated to the Ukraine Humanitarian Appeal.

Notable DEC appeals
The first DEC appeal was run for victims of an earthquake in Turkey in 1966.

In 2004, the Disasters Emergency Committee (DEC) ran UK television appeals and telephone lines for donations following the 2004 Indian Ocean earthquake and tsunami, which raised a record  £392m in public donations,

Between January and July 2010, the DEC appealed for donations following the 2010 Haiti earthquake, raising a total of £107 million.

On 22 January 2009, the BBC declined a request from the DEC to screen an appeal to raise money to aid relief efforts for victims of conflict in the Gaza Strip, as they felt supporting the appeal would effectively mean the BBC taking a political stance on the Gaza conflict. This decision was the object of considerable controversy within the BBC as it is the only time the BBC is known to have refused such a request from the DEC; the 2009 Gaza appeal in question was screened by Channel 4 and ITV and raised £8.3m. Since then, the BBC has broadcast other DEC aid appeals for people in Gaza, without similar controversy. The DEC August 2014 Gaza appeal shown by the BBC helped to raise £16m over two years.

On the launch of its appeal in October 2017 for Rohingya refugees fleeing Myanmar to Bangladesh, the UK Government pledged to double public donations up to £3 million. Similarly, a pledge to match public donations up to £20 million was made by the UK Government in 2022 in response to the Russian invasion of Ukraine.

Notable fundraising events for the Ukraine Humanitarian Appeal

In March 2022, Royal Ballet star Ivan Putrov directed Dance For Ukraine alongside Romanian ballet dancer Alina Cojocaru. The event took place at the London Coliseum on 19 March and raised £140,000 for DEC's Ukraine Humanitarian Appeal.

On 29 March 2022, Concert for Ukraine took place at Resorts World Arena in Birmingham and it aired on ITV. It was presented by Capital FM presenter Roman Kemp, Marvin Humes and Emma Bunton. ITV pledged people to donate to DEC's Ukraine Humanitarian Appeal. Artists included Snow Patrol, Tom Odell, Ed Sheeran and Camilla Cabello and the show ran for two hours. More than £13.4 million was donated by midday the day after the concert.

Member charities of the Disasters Emergency Committee 

As of December 2021, the committee's member organisations are:

List of DEC appeals
Recent and archive DEC appeals.

References

External links
 Official DEC website

Charities based in London
Disaster management
1963 establishments in the United Kingdom
Organisations based in the London Borough of Camden
Organizations established in 1963